The Salt Fork Brazos River is a braided, highly intermittent stream about  long, heading along the edge of the Llano Estacado about  east-southeast of Lubbock, Texas. The Salt Fork stretches across portions of Crosby, Garza, Kent, and Stonewall counties of West Texas.

Geography
From the edge of the Caprock Escarpment, the stream channel generally runs southeastward across southern Crosby County, passing to the east of Courthouse Mountain and crossing Texas State Highway 207. It passes to the west of the mostly abandoned community of Canyon Valley and then crosses into the thinly populated ranch country of northern Garza County. After passing Duffy's Peak and then crossing Farm to Market Road 651, the Salt Fork merges with McDonald Creek, a few miles north of Verbena, Texas. The stream then begins tending in a more easterly direction as it meanders wildly, eventually crossing from Garza into Kent County, where it merges with the White River just before it passes beneath Farm to Market Road 1081. The stream continues to meander as it crosses Texas State Highway 208 north of Clairemont and U.S. Highway 380 to the southwest of Jayton. After passing into Stonewall County, the Salt Fork turns sharply to the north, where it again crosses  Highway 380 and passes to the north of Peacock and Swenson. Double Mountain divides the watersheds of the Salt Fork to the north and the Double Mountain Fork to the south.

Overall, the Salt Fork descends  from its headwaters to its confluence with the Double Mountain Fork, passing through flat to moderately steep terrain along its course.

Proper name
According to a 1964 decision by the United States Board on Geographical Names, this tributary of the Brazos is properly called the Salt Fork Brazos River, and should not be called the Salt Fork of the Brazos River.

See also
Blanco Canyon
Caprock Escarpment
List of rivers of Texas

References

External links
USGS Brazos River Basin Historical Streamflow
Brazos River Authority 

Rivers of Texas
Rivers of Lubbock County, Texas
Rivers of Garza County, Texas
Rivers of Stonewall County, Texas
Rivers of Crosby County, Texas
Rivers of Kent County, Texas